Valdaone is a comune (municipality) in the Province of Trentino in the Italian region Trentino-Alto Adige/Südtirol.

It was established on 1 January 2015 by the merger of the municipalities of Bersone, Daone and Praso.

References